George Edward Northcott (7 May 1935 – 15 November 2010) was an English professional footballer.

Northcott joined Torquay United, where his elder brother Tommy was already an established first team player, as a junior. He turned professional in October 1952, but had to wait until the 1954–55 season for his league debut. He played over 160 times for Torquay before leaving at the end of the 1961–62 season.

He joined non-league Cheltenham Town from where he joined Exeter City in August 1963. However, he played just once for City, before returning to non-league football.

References 

1935 births
Sportspeople from Torquay
English footballers
Torquay United F.C. players
Cheltenham Town F.C. players
Gloucester City A.F.C. players
Exeter City F.C. players
English Football League players
2010 deaths
Association football central defenders